Riyan International Airport (also known as Riyan Mukalla International Airport) is an airport in Mukalla, Hadhramaut, Yemen. It is not to be confused with the former RAF Riyan, which is located closer to Mukalla.

History
The original airport was built around the 1930s.

Flights were suspended in March 2015 as a result of the Yemeni civil war which led Al Qaeda militants to take advantage of the turmoil and control Mukalla. A no-fly zone over Yemen was imposed by the Saudi Arabian-led intervention due to the military conflict. Mukalla was later liberated from Al Qaeda, but the airport remained closed until the Emirates Red Crescent funded the building of new terminals and renovated the old airport at a cost of AED 25 million. On November 27, 2019, the airport was reopened with the support of the Emirates Red Crescent. The Governor of Hadramawt province, Maj Gen Faraj Al Bahsani, said he was optimistic that the return of flights would bring economic benefits. On the 9th of April 2021,  Yemenia restarted flights to Socotra and Aden.

Airlines and destinations

References

Airports in Yemen
Mukalla